Sang-dong Station is a railway station on Seoul Subway Line 7. It is located in Bucheon between Seoul and Incheon. It was previously known as Sang-ri, but that name was changed to its modern name Sang-dong, after Bucheon's status was elevated to Bucheon-si.

Station layout

References

Seoul Metropolitan Subway stations
Metro stations in Bucheon
Railway stations opened in 2012